The following lists events that happened during 2010 in Rwanda.

Incumbents 
 President: Paul Kagame 
 Prime Minister: Bernard Makuza

Events

February
 February 17 - Rwanda will be the global host of World Environment Day on 5 June 2010.
 February 25 - The International Criminal Tribunal for Rwanda jails Lieut-Col Eprem Setako, the Ministry of Defence's former head of legal affairs, for 25 years after finding him guilty of genocide and crimes against humanity.

March
 March 2 - Agathe Habyarimana, the widow of former President Juvénal Habyarimana, accused of helping plan the 1994 genocide, is arrested in France.
 March 9 - First President of Rwanda Dominique Mbonyumutwa's son objects to the removal of his father's corpse from the Democracy Stadium in Gitarama, saying it defies a court ruling.

April
 April 7 - At least six people die and at least twelve others are injured after a boat sinks in Lake Kivu while carrying people to commemorations to mark the 16th anniversary of the Rwandan genocide.
 April 20 - Two high-ranking officers are suspended from Rwanda's military and arrested; Maj-Gen Charles Muhire is accused of corruption and misuse of office, whilst Lt-Gen Karenzi Karake is accused of immoral conduct.
 April 21 - Rwandan opposition leader Victoire Ingabire Umuhoza is arrested on charges such as collaboration with a terrorist organisation and genocide denial.
 April 22 - President Paul Kagame's rival Victoire Ingabire Umuhoza is released one day after her arrest on charges of terrorism and genocide denial but banned from leaving Kigali and ordered to report to authorities twice a month.

References

 
2010s in Rwanda
Years of the 21st century in Rwanda
Rwanda
Rwanda